Johann Valentin Görner (27 February 170230 July 1762) was a German composer.

He was born in Penig, the brother of organist Johann Gottlieb Görner. He died, aged 60, in Hamburg.

References

External links
 

1702 births
1762 deaths
German Baroque composers
18th-century classical composers
German classical composers
German male classical composers
18th-century German composers
18th-century German male musicians